Algodres may refer to:
Algodres, a civil parish in the municipality of Figueira de Castelo Rodrigo, Guarda, Portugal
Algodres, a civil parish in the municipality of Fornos de Algodres, Guarda, Portugal

See also
Algodre
Fornos de Algodres